The term intervertebral disc annuloplasty indicates any  procedure aimed at repairing the annulus of a bulging intervertebral disc before it herniates.

Intradiscal electrothermal annuloplasty
IDET ("Intradiscal Electrothermal Annuloplasty") is a recently developed minimally invasive form of annuloplasty consisting of the insertion in the affected disc of a hollow needle, through which a heating wire is passed; once this has reached the disc, the wire is heated to 90 °C for approximately fifteen minutes. The heat is intended to seal any ruptures in the disc wall and may also burn nerve endings, which can make the area less sensitive to pain.

See also
Disc biacuplasty

References

Neurosurgery